(screened as Republican Gangsters in some markets) is a French political drama television series which premiered on Canal+ on 8 February 2016. The series was developed by Eric Benzekri and Jean-Baptiste Delafon.

Premise
Baron Noir is the political and judicial saga of Philippe Rickwaert, member of Parliament and mayor of Dunkerque, who is driven by an irrepressible thirst for personal revenge. Between rounds of the Presidential election, he sees his future collapse when his mentor, the leftist candidate, sacrifices him to save his campaign. Determined to reinvent his career, Rickwaert uses cunning and connections to win political fights against those who betrayed him, creating a new alliance with the closest adviser of his enemy. Formidable but uncontrollable, conflicted between truth and lies, cultivating friendships in all strata of society (including within the police and organized crime), Philippe Rickwaert's life dissolves into a fascinating organised chaos. Rickwaert takes the fight to his opponents - and to his own demons - at every opportunity.

Cast

Main
 Kad Merad as Philippe Rickwaert
 Niels Arestrup as Francis Laugier (Season 1)
 Anna Mouglalis as Amélie Dorendeu
 Hugo Becker as Cyril Balsan
 Astrid Whettnall as Véronique Bosso

Recurring
 Laurent Spielvogel as Armand Chambolle
 Jade Phan-Gia as Françoise Levasseur
 Lubna Gourion as Salomé Rickwaert
 Scali Delpeyrat as Martin Borde
 Philippe Résimont as Daniel Kalhenberg
 Eric Caruso as Laurent Mirmont
 Erika Sainte as Fanny Alvergne
 Maryne Bertieaux as Alison

Guest
Season 1
 Michel Voïta as Jean-Marc Auzanet
 Jean-Pierre Martins as Bruno Rickwaert
 Michel Muller as Gérard Balleroy
 Mahdi Belemlih as Medhi Fateni
 Patrick Rocca as Alain Chistera
 Alban Aumard as Sylvain Buisine
 Yannick Morzelle as Bruce Rickwaert
 Rémy Stiel as Jordan Rickwaert
 Marie Lanchas as Elodie Jacquemot
 Alain Pointier as Jean-Pierre Barthélémy
 Stéphane Ropa as Boris Valentin
 Phénix Brossard as Sébastien
 Damien Jouillerot as Toph
 Alain Pronnier as Eddy
 Jean-Erns Marie-Louise as Ménadier
 Brigitte Froment as Maryse
 Léon Plazol as Théo
 Sébastien Beuret as Arthur

Season 3
 Marie-France Alvarez as Malika

Episodes

Season 1 (2016)

Season 2 (2018)

Season 3 (2020)

Development and production
On 29 February 2016, Eric Benzekri, the writer of the series announced that the season 2 will be shot during the next presidential and it was aired in 2018. Season 3 debuted in February 2020.

Reception
The TV Series was very well received by French critics. Le Monde, L'Obs, Les Inrockuptibles, Metro International, Paris Match and Télérama gave the first season 4 out of 5 stars. L'Express and Libération gave 3.5 out of 5 stars.

Accolades

References

External links
 
 

2010s French drama television series
2020s French drama television series
2016 French television series debuts
French political drama television series
Serial drama television series
French-language television shows
Television shows set in France
Canal+ original programming
Television series by StudioCanal